Columbus Junction is a city in Louisa County, Iowa. The population was 1,830 at the 2020 census. It is part of the Muscatine Micropolitan Statistical Area.

Columbus Junction is home of the historic Swinging Bridge, found one block south of Highway 92 near downtown. The 262-foot-long steel cable and wood suspension bridge was built in 1922 as an elevated walkway connecting Third and Fourth streets.

The Columbus Community School District (which serves Columbus Junction, Columbus City, Fredonia, Cotter, Conesville, and other surrounding townships) is based in Columbus Junction. The school's colors are blue and white and their mascot is a wildcat.

The city's largest employer is a Tyson Foods meat processing plant located just north of the city on Highway 70.

History
Columbus Junction began as a settlement located at the intersection of two railroad lines. The Chicago, Rock Island and Pacific Railroad (also known as the Rock Island [Line]) built an east–west line through the area in 1858, and the perpendicular north–south Burlington, Cedar Rapids and Minnesota Railroad (BCR&M) line was built in 1870.

The first local business, a restaurant and boarding house imported via the Rock Island from Muscatine, Iowa, opened the day after a BCR&M train made the inaugural stop and crossing of the newly completed intersection. Just a month later, on March 12, 1870, the town was platted.

Neighboring Columbus City had been established before the railroads arrived and both the Rock Island and BCR&M had built their lines over a mile's distance away. Because they had invested in the latter line, they were permitted to name the new town, and so it became Columbus Junction.

The largest sustained period of growth for Columbus Junction was from 1960 to 2000, driven primarily by job creation in meat processing. From 1961 to 1982 Rath Packing Company operated a hog processing plant just north of the city. In 1985 the facility reopened under the ownership of IBP, and in 2001 was bought by Tyson Foods.

Immigration has played a strong role in the history of Columbus Junction. The most recent wave of immigrants includes refugees from the Chin State of Myanmar (Burma). Many of them work in the meat processing plants.

The Iowa Flood of 2008 impacted Columbus Junction along with many other towns and cities. The damage dealt by the inundation affected 29 businesses and non-profits, but the community has since been able to recover.

Geography
Columbus Junction is located between the cities of Columbus City and Fredonia. It lies at the confluence of two rivers, the Iowa and the Cedar.

Demographics

2010 census
As of the census of 2010, there were 1,899 people, 687 households, and 468 families residing in the city. The racial makeup of the city was 74.2% White, 1.6% African American, 0.3% Native American, 3.4% Asian, 17.4% from other races, and 3.0% from two or more races. Hispanic or Latino of any race were 48.0% of the population.

There were 687 households, of which 36.4% had children under the age of 18 living with them, 52.3% were married couples living together, 10.0% had a female householder with no husband present, 5.8% had a male householder with no wife present, and 31.9% were non-families. 26.6% of all households were made up of individuals, and 9.7% had someone living alone who was 65 years of age or older. The average household size was 2.72 and the average family size was 3.28.

The median age in the city was 35.9 years. 27.1% of residents were under the age of 18; 8.9% were between the ages of 18 and 24; 25.7% were from 25 to 44; 25.3% were from 45 to 64; and 13% were 65 years of age or older. The gender makeup of the city was 51.8% male and 48.2% female.

2000 census
As of the census of 2000, there were 1,900 people, 691 households, and 487 families residing in the city. The racial makeup of the city was 85.32% White, 0.58% African American, 0.05% Native American, 0.11% Asian, 12.37% from other races, and 1.58% from two or more races. Hispanic or Latino of any race were 39.00% of the population.

There were 691 households, out of which 37.2% had children under the age of 18 living with them, 55.3% were married couples living together, 9.3% had a female householder with no husband present, and 29.5% were non-families. 26.3% of all households were made up of individuals, and 11.7% had someone living alone who was 65 years of age or older. The average household size was 2.68 and the average family size was 3.24.

28.6% are under the age of 18, 8.9% from 18 to 24, 28.9% from 25 to 44, 19.8% from 45 to 64, and 13.7% who were 65 years of age or older. The median age was 34 years. For every 100 females, there were 97.1 males. For every 100 females age 18 and over, there were 91.3 males.

The median income for a household in the city was $33,167, and the median income for a family was $42,188. Males had a median income of $27,841 versus $22,566 for females. The per capita income for the city was $16,314. About 9.7% of families and 11.2% of the population were below the poverty line, including 13.7% of those under age 18 and 8.2% of those age 65 or over.

Notable people
Bill Orr, former First Gentleman of Nebraska (1987-1991), raised in Columbus Junction.
Billie Ray, wife of Iowa Governor Robert D. Ray and First Lady of Iowa; born in Columbus Junction in 1928.
Karl Weber, television and radio actor who starred in Maverick, Perry Mason, Dr. Kildare and other shows in the 20th century, was born in Columbus Junction.

See also

Impact of the COVID-19 pandemic on the meat industry in the United States

References

External links

City website

Cities in Iowa
Cities in Louisa County, Iowa
Muscatine, Iowa micropolitan area
Populated places established in 1870
1870 establishments in Iowa